Antony Roy Clark MA (Cantab.) (born 7 November 1956) is a South African schoolmaster and educationalist, formerly a first-class cricketer, currently Rector (headmaster) of Michaelhouse, KwaZulu-Natal.

Early life
Born at Grahamstown, Cape Province, South Africa, in 1956, Clark is the son of Roger and Betty Clark. He was educated at St. Andrew's College, Grahamstown, and Rhodes University, where he graduated BA and HDE, then at Downing College, Cambridge, where he held the Douglas Smith Scholarship and graduated MA in 1981. At Cambridge he, on occasion, played for Cambridge University Cricket Club and was president of the Downing College MCR.

Schoolmaster
Clark taught at Westerford High School, Cape Town, from 1984 to 1990. He then worked at Liberty Life before being appointed as Headmaster of St Joseph's Marist College, Cape Town, in 1992 and of his own old school, St Andrew's College, in 1994. In 2002 he moved as head to Gresham's School in Norfolk, England. Thereafter in 2008, he was appointed at Malvern College in Worcestershire for his fourth headship.

In 2019, Clark became the Rector of Michaelhouse in Balgowan, South Africa. This is his fifth headship.

Private life
In 1981, Clark married Dr Brigitte Jennifer Lang, and they have one son and two daughters.

He gives his recreations in the British Who's Who as cricket, squash, chess, reading, and hiking.

References

External links
Antony Roy Clark at cricinfo.com
Address by Antony Roy Clark to graduands at Rhodes University Graduation, 2002

1956 births
Living people
Alumni of Downing College, Cambridge
Cambridge University cricketers
Alumni of St. Andrew's College, Grahamstown
Rhodes University alumni
People educated at Gresham's School
South African cricketers
South African schoolteachers
South African educational theorists
Headmasters of Gresham's School
20th-century South African educators
21st-century South African educators
Headmasters of Malvern College